The North River is a  tidal river in the U.S. state of Virginia.  It is an arm of Mobjack Bay, itself part of Chesapeake Bay.  The North River forms the boundary between Mathews and Gloucester counties.

See also
List of rivers of Virginia

References

USGS Hydrologic Unit Map - State of Virginia (1974)

Rivers of Virginia
Rivers of Mathews County, Virginia
Rivers of Gloucester County, Virginia